Regulation is the management of complex systems according to a set of rules and trends. In systems theory, these types of rules exist in various fields of biology and society, but the term has slightly different meanings according to context. For example:
 in biology, gene regulation and metabolic regulation allow living organisms to adapt to their environment and maintain homeostasis;
 in government, typically regulation means stipulations of the delegated legislation which is drafted by subject-matter experts to enforce primary legislation;
 in business,  industry self-regulation occurs through self-regulatory organizations and trade associations which allow industries to set and enforce rules with less government involvement; and,
 in psychology, self-regulation theory is the study of how individuals regulate their thoughts and behaviors to reach goals.

Social 

Regulation in the social, political, psychological, and economic domains can take many forms: legal restrictions promulgated by a government authority, contractual obligations (for example, contracts between insurers and their insureds), self-regulation in psychology, social regulation (e.g. norms), co-regulation, third-party regulation, certification, accreditation or market regulation.

State-mandated regulation is government intervention in the private market in an attempt to implement policy and produce outcomes which might not otherwise occur, ranging from consumer protection to faster growth or technological advancement.

The regulations may prescribe or proscribe conduct ("command-and-control" regulation), calibrate incentives ("incentive" regulation), or change preferences ("preferences shaping" regulation). Common examples of regulation include limits on environmental pollution , laws against child labor or other employment regulations,  minimum wages laws, regulations requiring truthful labelling of the ingredients in food and drugs, and food and drug safety regulations establishing minimum standards of testing and quality for what can be sold, and zoning and  development approvals regulation.  Much less common are controls on market entry, or price regulation.

One critical question in regulation is whether the regulator or government has sufficient information to make ex-ante regulation more efficient than ex-post liability for harm and whether industry self-regulation might be preferable. The economics of imposing or removing regulations relating to markets is analysed in empirical legal studies, law and economics, political science, environmental science, health economics, and regulatory economics.

Power to regulate should include the power to enforce regulatory decisions. Monitoring is an important tool used by national regulatory authorities in carrying out the regulated activities.

In some countries (in particular the Scandinavian countries) industrial relations are to a very high degree regulated by the labour market parties themselves (self-regulation) in contrast to state regulation of minimum wages etc.

Reasons

Regulations may create costs as well as benefits and may produce unintended reactivity effects, such as defensive practice. Efficient regulations can be defined as those where total benefits exceed total costs.

Regulations can be advocated for a variety of reasons, including 
 Market failures – regulation due to inefficiency. Intervention due to what economists call market failure.
 To constrain sellers' options in markets characterized by monopoly
 As a means to implement collective action, in order to provide public goods
 To assure adequate information in the market
 To mitigate undesirable externalities
 Collective desires – regulation about collective desires or considered judgments on the part of a significant segment of society
 Diverse experiences – regulation with a view of eliminating or enhancing opportunities for the formation of diverse preferences and beliefs
 Social subordination – regulation aimed to increase or reduce social subordination of various social groups
 Endogenous preferences – regulation intended to affect the development of certain preferences on an aggregate level
 Professional conduct – the regulation of members of professional bodies, either acting under statutory or contractual powers.
 Interest group transfers – regulation that results from efforts by self-interest groups to redistribute wealth in their favor, which may be disguised as one or more of the justifications above.
The study of formal (legal or official) and informal (extra-legal or unofficial) regulation constitutes one of the central concerns of the sociology of law.

History 

Regulation of businesses existed in the ancient early Egyptian, Indian, Greek, and Roman civilizations. Standardized weights and measures existed to an extent in the ancient world, and gold may have operated to some degree as an international currency. In China, a national currency system existed and paper currency was invented. Sophisticated law existed in Ancient Rome. In the European Early Middle Ages, law and standardization declined with the Roman Empire, but regulation existed in the form of norms, customs, and privileges; this regulation was aided by the unified Christian identity and a sense of honor regarding contracts.

Modern industrial regulation can be traced to the Railway Regulation Act 1844 in the United Kingdom, and succeeding Acts. Beginning in the late 19th and 20th centuries, much of regulation in the United States was administered and enforced by regulatory agencies which produced their own administrative law and procedures under the authority of statutes. Legislators created these agencies to allow experts in the industry to focus their attention on the issue. At the federal level, one of the earliest institutions was the Interstate Commerce Commission which had its roots in earlier state-based regulatory commissions and agencies. Later agencies include the Federal Trade Commission, Securities and Exchange Commission, Civil Aeronautics Board, and various other institutions. These institutions vary from industry to industry and at the federal and state level. Individual agencies do not necessarily have clear life-cycles or patterns of behavior, and they are influenced heavily by their leadership and staff as well as the organic law creating the agency. In the 1930s, lawmakers believed that unregulated business often led to injustice and inefficiency; in the 1960s and 1970s, concern shifted to regulatory capture, which led to extremely detailed laws creating the United States Environmental Protection Agency and Occupational Safety and Health Administration.

See also

References

External links 

 Centre on Regulation in Europe (CERRE)
 New Perspectives on Regulation (2009) and Government and Markets: Toward a New Theory of Regulation (2009)
 US/Canadian Regulatory Cooperation:  Schmitz on Lessons from the European Union, Canadian Privy Council Office Commissioned Study
 A Comparative Bibliography: Regulatory Competition on Corporate Law

Wikibooks 
 Legal and Regulatory Issues in the Information Economy
 Lawrence A. Cunningham, A Prescription to Retire the Rhetoric of 'Principles-Based Systems' in Corporate Law, Securities Regulation and Accounting (2007)

 
Economics of regulation

Public policy